Ramee Mall is a shopping mall located in Anna Salai at Teynampet, Chennai. The mall with 2,25,000 sq.ft of built up area was opened in March 2012. Built by Dubai-based Ramee group, the mall occupies the first three floors of the property. The remaining 15 floors are occupied by Hyatt Regency Chennai.

References

External links
 

Shopping malls in Chennai
Shopping malls established in 2012
2012 establishments in Tamil Nadu